The 2018–19 Portland Trail Blazers season was the franchise's 49th season in the National Basketball Association (NBA).

Prior to the season, owner Paul Allen died at the age of 65, and thus the team's ownership was (and is currently) managed by his estate.

On March 25, 2019, the Trail Blazers clinched a playoff spot after defeating the Brooklyn Nets 148–144 in double overtime. Jusuf Nurkić suffered a season-ending injury in the same game.

In the playoffs, the Trail Blazers defeated the Oklahoma City Thunder in the first round, thanks to Damian Lillard's 37-foot series-clinching three pointer over Paul George in Game 5 at home, similar to his game-winner against the Houston Rockets in Game 6 of the First Round in the 2014 playoffs. The Trail Blazers thus won their first playoff series since 2016. 

In the Semifinals, the Trail Blazers faced the Denver Nuggets. In Game 3 of the Semifinals, the Trail Blazers defeated the Nuggets 140–137 in the first quadruple overtime playoff game since 1953. They would eventually defeat the Nuggets in seven games, advancing to their first Western Conference Finals since 2000. However, the Trail Blazers would be swept by the defending two-time NBA champion Golden State Warriors in four games. In that series, the Trail Blazers became the first team in 20 seasons to have a lead of 17 points or more in three straight playoff games and lose all three.

Draft picks

Roster

<noinclude>

Standings

Division

Conference

Game log

Preseason

|- style="background:#fcc;"
| 1
| September 29
| @ Toronto
| 
| Leonard (14)
| Swanigan (8)
| Baldwin IV, Turner (3)
| Rogers Arena18,654
| 0–1
|- style="background:#bfb;"
| 2
| October 5
| @ Phoenix
| 
| Nurkic (16)
| Nurkic (9)
| Lillard, McCollum (5)
| Talking Stick Resort Arena11,811
| 1–1
|- style="background:#fcc;"
| 3
| October 7
| Utah
| 
| Lillard (23)
| Nurkic (11)
| Lillard (7)
| Moda Center19,441
| 1–2
|- style="background:#bfb;"
| 4
| October 10
| Phoenix
| 
| Layman (28)
| Nurkic (8)
| Stauskas (5)
| Moda Center15,051
| 2–2
|- style="background:#bfb;"
| 5
| October 12
| Sacramento
| 
| McCollum (21)
| Collins (10)
| McCollum (6)
| Moda Center16,521
| 3–2

Regular season 

|- bgcolor=ccffcc
| 1
| October 18
| LA Lakers
| 
| Damian Lillard (28)
| Jusuf Nurkic (9)
| Evan Turner (6)
| Moda Center19,996
| 1–0
|- bgcolor=ccffcc
| 2
| October 20
| San Antonio
| 
| Damian Lillard (29)
| Nurkic, Harkless (8)
| Damian Lillard (9)
| Moda Center18,354
| 2–0
|- bgcolor=ffcccc
| 3
| October 22
| Washington
| 
| Damian Lillard (29)
| Jusuf Nurkic (18)
| Damian Lillard (8)
| Moda Center19,187
| 2–1
|- bgcolor=ccffcc
| 4
| October 25
| @ Orlando
| 
| Damian Lillard (41)
| Al-Farouq Aminu (15)
| Lillard, Turner (6)
| Amway Center15,114
| 3–1
|- bgcolor=ffcccc
| 5
| October 27
| @ Miami
| 
| Damian Lillard (42)
| Lillard, Nurkic, McCollum (7)
| Damian Lillard (6)
| American Airlines Arena19,600
| 3–2
|- bgcolor=ccffcc
| 6
| October 29
| @ Indiana
| 
| Collins, McCollum (17)
| Al-Farouq Aminu (10)
| Nik Stauskas (5)
| Bankers Life Fieldhouse15,788
| 4–2
|- bgcolor=ccffcc
| 7
| October 30
| @ Houston
| 
| Lillard, Nurkic (22)
| Jusuf Nurkic (10)
| Damian Lillard (7)
| Toyota Center18,055
| 5–2

|- style="background:#cfc;"
| 8
| November 1
| New Orleans
| 
| Damian Lillard (33)
| Al-Farouq Aminu (10)
| Evan Turner (7)
| Moda Center18,921
| 6–2
|- style="background:#fcc;"
| 9
| November 3
| LA Lakers
| 
| Lillard, McCollum (30)
| Aminu, Nurkić (13)
| Lillard, McCollum, Stauskas (4)
| Moda Center19,848
| 6–3
|- style="background:#cfc;"
| 10
| November 4
| Minnesota
| 
| Jusuf Nurkic (19)
| Jusuf Nurkic (12)
| Damian Lillard (5)
| Moda Center19,522
| 7–3
|- style="background:#cfc;"
| 11
| November 6
| Milwaukee
| 
| CJ McCollum (40)
| Evan Turner (11)
| McCollum, Nurkić (6)
| Moda Center19,512
| 8–3
|- style="background:#cfc;"
| 12
| November 8
| LA Clippers
| 
| Damian Lillard (25)
| Jusuf Nurkic (9)
| Evan Turner (7)
| Moda Center19,170
| 9–3
|- style="background:#cfc;"
| 13
| November 11
| Boston
| 
| Damian Lillard (19)
| Jusuf Nurkic (17)
| Damian Lillard (12)
| Moda Center19,712
| 10–3
|- style="background:#fcc;"
| 14
| November 14
| @ LA Lakers
| 
| Damian Lillard (31)
| Jusuf Nurkic (14)
| Damian Lillard (11)
| Staples Center18,997
| 10–4
|- style="background:#fcc;"
| 15
| November 16
| @ Minnesota
| 
| CJ McCollum (18)
| Jusuf Nurkic (11)
| Damian Lillard (5)
| Target Center18,978
| 10–5
|-style="background:#cfc
| 16
| November 18
| @ Washington
| 
| Damian Lillard (40)
| Jusuf Nurkic (14)
| Jusuf Nurkic (8)
| Capital One Arena16,647
| 11–5
|- style="background:#cfc;"
| 17
| November 20
| @ New York
| 
| CJ McCollum (31)
| Jusuf Nurkic (11)
| Damian Lillard (8)
| Madison Square Garden19,812
| 12–5
|- style="background:#fcc"
| 18
| November 21
| @ Milwaukee
| 
| McCollum, Lillard (22)
| Al-Farouq Aminu (9)
| Damian Lillard (5)
| Fiserv Forum17,591
| 12–6
|- style="background:#fcc;"
| 19
| November 23
| @ Golden State
| 
| Damian Lillard (23)
| Jusuf Nurkic (8)
| Damian Lillard (8)
| Oracle Arena19,596
| 12–7
|- style="background:#fcc;"
| 20
| November 25
| LA Clippers
| 
| Damian Lillard (30)
| Meyers Leonard (16)
| Damian Lillard (4)
| Moda Center19,138
| 12–8
|- style="background:#cfc;"
| 21
| November 28
| Orlando
| 
| Damian Lillard (41)
| Jusuf Nurkic (13)
| Evan Turner (7)
| Moda Center18,865
| 13–8
|-style="background:#fcc"
| 22
| November 30
| Denver
| 
| CJ McCollum (33)
| Jusuf Nurkic (11)
| Damian Lillard (8)
| Moda Center19,459
| 13–9

|- style="background:#fcc
| 23 
| December 2
| @ San Antonio
| 
| Damian Lillard (37)
| Al-Farouq Aminu (9)
| Damian Lillard (10)
| AT&T Center18,354
| 13–10
|-style="background:#fcc
| 24
| December 4
| @ Dallas
| 
| Damian Lillard (33)
| Al-Farouq Aminu (13)
| Damian Lillard (8)
| American Airlines Center19,431
| 13–11
|- style="background:#cfc
| 25
| December 6
| Phoenix
| 
| Damian Lillard (25)
| Jusuf Nurkic (14)
| Damian Lillard (8)
| Moda Center19,001
| 14–11
|- style="background:#cfc
| 26
| December 8
| Minnesota
| 
| Damian Lillard (28)
| Jusuf Nurkic (11)
| Damian Lillard (6)
| Moda Center19,359
| 15–11
|- style="background:#fcc
| 27
| December 11
| @ Houston
| 
| Damian Lillard (34)
| Al-Farouq Aminu (15)
| Evan Turner (6)
| Toyota Center18,055
| 15–12
|- style="background:#fcc
| 28
| December 12
| @ Memphis
| 
| CJ McCollum (40)
| Jusuf Nurkic (10)
| Lillard, Turner, Leonard (3)
| FedExForum16,282
| 15–13
|- style="background:#cfc
| 29
| December 14
| Toronto
| 
| Damian Lillard (24)
| Jusuf Nurkic (9)
| Jusuf Nurkic (7)
| Moda Center19,596
| 16–13
|- style="background:#cfc
| 30
| December 17
| @ LA Clippers
| 
| Damian Lillard (39)
| Al-Farouq Aminu (10)
| Jusuf Nurkic (7)
| Staples Center16,030
| 17–13
|- style="background:#cfc
| 31
| December 19
| Memphis
| 
| Damian Lillard (24)
| Meyers Leonard (8)
| Lillard, Turner (4)
| Moda Center19,412
| 18–13
|- style="background:#fcc
| 32
| December 21
| Utah
| 
| Damian Lillard (19)
| Jusuf Nurkic (10)
| Jusuf Nurkic (4)
| Moda Center19,127
| 18–14
|- style="background:#cfc
| 33
| December 23
| Dallas
| 
| Damian Lillard (33)
| Jusuf Nurkic (12)
| Damian Lillard (7)
| Moda Center19,707
| 19–14
|- style="background:#fcc
| 34
| December 25
| @ Utah
| 
| Damian Lillard (20)
| Jusuf Nurkic (10)
| Damian Lillard (4)
| Vivint Smart Home Arena18,306
| 19–15
|- style="background:#cfc
| 35
| December 27
| @ Golden State
| 
| Jusuf Nurkic (27)
| Aminu, Nurkic (12)
| Damian Lillard (5)
| Oracle Arena19,596
| 20–15
|- style="background:#fcc
| 36
| December 29
| Golden State
| 
| Damian Lillard (40)
| Jusuf Nurkic (10)
| Jusuf Nurkic (7)
| Moda Center19,797
| 20–16
|- style="background:#cfc
| 37
| December 30
| Philadelphia
| 
| CJ McCollum (35)
| Aminu, Leonard (8)
| Damian Lillard (5)
| Moda Center19,393
| 21–16

|- style="background:#cfc
| 38 
| January 1
| @ Sacramento
| 
| Damian Lillard (25)
| Jusuf Nurkic (23)
| Jusuf Nurkic (7)
| Golden 1 Center17,583
| 22–16
|- style="background:#fcc
| 39
| January 4
| Oklahoma City
| 
| Damian Lillard (23)
| Al-Farouq Aminu (15)
| Damian Lillard (8)
| Moda Center19,393
| 22–17
|- style="background:#cfc
| 40
| January 5
| Houston
| 
| Jusuf Nurkic (25)
| Jusuf Nurkic (15)
| Damian Lillard (12)
| Moda Center19,577
| 23–17
|- style="background:#cfc
| 41
| January 7
| New York
| 
| Jusuf Nurkic (20)
| Jake Layman (10)
| Damian Lillard (9)
| Moda Center19,026
| 24–17
|- style="background:#cfc
| 42
| January 9
| Chicago
| 
| CJ McCollum (24)
| Zach Collins (9)
| Damian Lillard (10)
| Moda Center19,393
| 25–17
|- style="background:#cfc
| 43
| January 11
| Charlotte
| 
| CJ McCollum (30)
| Jusuf Nurkic (11)
| Jusuf Nurkic (8)
| Moda Center19,393
| 26–17
|- style="background:#fcc
| 44
| January 13
| @ Denver
| 
| Damian Lillard (26)
| Al-Farouq Aminu (12)
| Damian Lillard (7)
| Pepsi Center19,520
| 26–18
|- style="background:#fcc
| 45
| January 14
| @ Sacramento
| 
| Damian Lillard (35)
| Aminu, Nurkic (11)
| Lillard, Nurkic (5)
| Golden 1 Center17,583
| 26–19
|- style="background:#cfc
| 46
| January 16
| Cleveland
| 
| Damian Lillard (33)
| Jusuf Nurkic (10)
| Jusuf Nurkic (10)
| Moda Center19,089
| 27–19
|- style="background:#cfc
| 47
| January 18
| New Orleans
| 
| Damian Lillard (24)
| Jusuf Nurkic (12)
| Damian Lillard (8)
| Moda Center19,598
| 28–19
|- style="background:#cfc
| 48
| January 21
| @ Utah
| 
| Damian Lillard (26)
| Lillard, Nurkic, Turner (8)
| Damian Lillard (8)
| Vivint Smart Home Arena18,306
| 29–19
|- style="background:#fcc
| 49
| January 22
| @ Oklahoma City
| 
| Damian Lillard (34)
| Jusuf Nurkic (15)
| Damian Lillard (8)
| Chesapeake Energy Arena18,203
| 29–20
|- style="background:#cfc
| 50
| January 24
| @ Phoenix
| 
| Damian Lillard (24)
| Jusuf Nurkic (9)
| Evan Turner (7)
| Talking Stick Resort Arena15,441
| 30–20
|- style="background:#cfc
| 51
| January 26
| Atlanta
| 
| CJ McCollum (28)
| CJ McCollum (10)
| CJ McCollum (10)
| Moda Center19,629
| 31–20
|- style="background:#cfc
| 52
| January 30
| Utah
| 
| Damian Lillard (36)
| Collins, Lillard (8)
| Damian Lillard (11)
| Moda Center19,393
| 32–20

|- style="background:#fcc
| 53 
| February 5
| Miami
| 
| CJ McCollum (33)
| Jake Layman (8)
| Damian Lillard (10)
| Moda Center19,468
| 32–21
|- style="background:#cfc
| 54
| February 7
| San Antonio
| 
| CJ McCollum (30)
| CJ McCollum (9)
| Damian Lillard (9)
| Moda Center19,393
| 33–21
|- style="background:#fcc
| 55
| February 10
| @ Dallas
| 
| Damian Lillard (30)
| Jusuf Nurkic (10)
| Evan Turner (7)
| American Airlines Center20,340
| 33–22
|- style="background:#fcc
| 56
| February 11
| @ Oklahoma City
| 
| Damian Lillard (31)
| Jusuf Nurkic (12)
| Damian Lillard (6)
| Chesapeake Energy Arena18,203
| 33–23
|- style="background:#cfc
| 57
| February 13
| Golden State
| 
| Damian Lillard (29)
| Jusuf Nurkic (11)
| Damian Lillard (8)
| Moda Center19,549
| 34–23
|- style="background:#cfc
| 58
| February 21
| @ Brooklyn
| 
| Jusuf Nurkic (27)
| Jusuf Nurkic (12)
| Damian Lillard (8)
| Barclays Center17,732
| 35–23
|- style="background:#cfc
| 59
| February 23
| @ Philadelphia
| 
| Jusuf Nurkic (24)
| Jake Layman (11)
| Damian Lillard (8)
| Wells Fargo Center20,619
| 36–23
|- style="background:#cfc
| 60
| February 25
| @ Cleveland
| 
| CJ McCollum (25)
| Harkless, Nurkic (8)
| Damian Lillard (8)
| Quicken Loans Arena19,432
| 37–23
|- style="background:#cfc
| 61
| February 27
| @ Boston
| 
| Damian Lillard (33)
| Maurice Harkless (10)
| Damian Lillard (4)
| TD Garden18,624
| 38–23

|- style="background:#fcc
| 62
| March 1
| @ Toronto
| 
| CJ McCollum (35)
| Damian Lillard (8)
| Damian Lillard (6)
| Scotiabank Arena19,800
| 38–24
|- style="background:#cfc
| 63
| March 3
| @ Charlotte
| 
| Rodney Hood (27)
| Jusuf Nurkic (15)
| McCollum, Nurkic (6)
| Spectrum Center18,355
| 39–24
|- style="background:#fcc
| 64
| March 5
| @ Memphis
| 
| CJ McCollum (27)
| Jusuf Nurkic (10)
| Jusuf Nurkic (9)
| FedExForum13,801
| 39–25
|- style="background:#fcc
| 65
| March 7
| Oklahoma City
| 
| Damian Lillard (51)
| Jusuf Nurkic (17)
| Damian Lillard (9)
| Moda Center20,037
| 39–26
|- style="background:#cfc
| 66
| March 9
| Phoenix
| 
| CJ McCollum (26)
| Jusuf Nurkic (9)
| Damian Lillard (9)
| Moda Center19,851
| 40–26
|- style="background:#cfc
| 67
| March 12
| @ L. A. Clippers
| 
| CJ McCollum (35)
| Jusuf Nurkic (12)
| Damian Lillard (12)
| Staples Center16,686
| 41–26
|- style="background:#cfc
| 68
| March 15
| @ New Orleans
| 
| Damian Lillard (24)
| Jusuf Nurkic (12)
| Damian Lillard (7)
| Smoothie King Center16,117
| 42–26
|- style="background:#fcc
| 69
| March 16
| @ San Antonio
| 
| Damian Lillard (34)
| Jusuf Nurkic (16)
| Lillard, McCollum (5)
| AT&T Center18,354
| 42–27
|- style="background:#cfc
| 70
| March 18
| Indiana
| 
| Damian Lillard (30)
| Jusuf Nurkic (11)
| Damian Lillard (15)
| Moda Center19,393
| 43–27
|- style="background:#cfc
| 71
| March 20
| Dallas
| 
| Damian Lillard (33)
| Jusuf Nurkic (10)
| Damian Lillard (12)
| Moda Center19,803
| 44–27
|- style="background:#cfc
| 72
| March 23
| Detroit
| 
| Damian Lillard (28)
| Aminu, Kanter (7)
| Damian Lillard (9)
| Moda Center19,815
| 45–27
|- style="background:#cfc
| 73
| March 25
| Brooklyn
| 
| Jusuf Nurkic (32)
| Jusuf Nurkic (16)
| Damian Lillard (12)
| Moda Center20,188
| 46–27
|- style="background: #cfc
| 74
| March 27
| @ Chicago
| 
| Seth Curry (20)
| Al-Farouq Aminu (11)
| Evan Turner (8)
| United Center20,506
| 47–27
|- style="background: #cfc
| 75
| March 29
| @ Atlanta
| 
| Damian Lillard (36)
| Al-Farouq Aminu (11)
| Damian Lillard (7)
| State Farm Arena16,182
| 48–27
|- style="background:#fcc
| 76
| March 30
| @ Detroit
| 
| Damian Lillard (23)
| Enes Kanter (15)
| Lillard, Leonard, S. Curry (3)
| Little Caesars Arena18,592
| 48–28

|- style="background: #cfc
| 77
| April 1
| @ Minnesota
| 
| Rodney Hood (21)
| Kanter, Turner (11)
| Damian Lillard (12)
| Target Center 11,209
| 49–28
|- style="background: #cfc
| 78
| April 3
| Memphis
| 
| Enes Kanter (21)
| Enes Kanter (15)
| Evan Turner (11)
| Moda Center19,608
| 50–28
|- style="background:#fcc
| 79
| April 5
| @ Denver
| 
| Enes Kanter (24)
| Al-Farouq Aminu (14)
| Damian Lillard (8)
| Pepsi Center19,928
| 50–29
|- style="background:#cfc
| 80
| April 7
| Denver
| 
| Damian Lillard (30)
| Enes Kanter (13)
| CJ McCollum (6)
| Moda Center19,890
| 51–29
|- style="background:#cfc
| 81
| April 9
| @ L. A. Lakers
| 
| Maurice Harkless (26)
| Enes Kanter (16)
| Damian Lillard (8)
| Staples Center18,997
| 52–29
|- style="background: #cfc
| 82 
| April 10
| Sacramento
| 
| Anfernee Simons (37)
| Skal Labissiere (15)
| Anfernee Simons (9)
| Moda Center19,814
| 53–29

Playoffs

Game log

|- bgcolor=ccffcc
| 1
| April 14
| Oklahoma City
| 
| Damian Lillard (30)
| Enes Kanter (18)
| Damian Lillard (4)
| Moda Center19,886
| 1–0
|- bgcolor=ccffcc
| 2
| April 16
| Oklahoma City
| 
| CJ McCollum (33)
| Maurice Harkless (9)
| Damian Lillard (6)
| Moda Center20,041
| 2–0
|- bgcolor=ffcccc
| 3
| April 19
| @ Oklahoma City
| 
| Damian Lillard (32)
| Al-Farouq Aminu (9)
| CJ McCollum (7)
| Chesapeake Energy Arena18,203
| 2–1
|- bgcolor=ccffcc
| 4
| April 21
| @ Oklahoma City
| 
| CJ McCollum (27)
| Kanter, Harkless (10)
| Damian Lillard (8)
| Chesapeake Energy Arena18,203
| 3–1
|- bgcolor=ccffcc
| 5
| April 23
| Oklahoma City
| 
| Damian Lillard (50)
| Enes Kanter (13)
| Damian Lillard (3)
| Moda Center20,041
| 4–1

|- bgcolor=ffcccc
| 1
| April 29
| @ Denver
| 
| Damian Lillard (39)
| Aminu, Turner (8)
| Damian Lillard (6)
| Pepsi Center19,520
| 0–1
|- bgcolor=ccffcc
| 2
| May 1
| @ Denver
| 
| CJ McCollum (20)
| Al-Farouq Aminu (10)
| CJ McCollum (6)
| Pepsi Center19,520
| 1–1
|- bgcolor=ccffcc
| 3
| May 3
| Denver
| 
| CJ McCollum (41)
| Enes Kanter (15)
| Damian Lillard (8)
| Moda Center20,193
| 2–1
|- bgcolor=ffcccc
| 4
| May 5
| Denver
| 
| CJ McCollum (29)
| Enes Kanter (10)
| Damian Lillard (7)
| Moda Center20,146
| 2–2
|- bgcolor=ffcccc
| 5
| May 7
| @ Denver
| 
| Damian Lillard (22)
| Enes Kanter (8)
| Damian Lillard (4)
| Pepsi Center19,520
| 2–3
|- bgcolor=ccffcc
| 6
| May 9
| Denver
| 
| Damian Lillard (32)
| Enes Kanter (14)
| Evan Turner (7)
| Moda Center20,022
| 3–3
|- bgcolor=ccffcc
| 7
| May 12
| @ Denver
| 
| CJ McCollum (37)
| Enes Kanter (13)
| Damian Lillard (8)
| Pepsi Center19,725
| 4–3

|- bgcolor=ffcccc
| 1
| May 14
| @ Golden State
| 
| Damian Lillard (19)
| Enes Kanter (16)
| Damian Lillard (6)
| Oracle Arena19,596
| 0–1
|- bgcolor=ffcccc
| 2
| May 16
| @ Golden State
| 
| Damian Lillard (23)
| Aminu, Leonard (6)
| Damian Lillard (10)
| Oracle Arena19,596
| 0–2
|- bgcolor=ffcccc
| 3
| May 18
| Golden State
| 
| CJ McCollum (23)
| Zach Collins (8)
| Damian Lillard (6)
| Moda Center20,214
| 0–3
|- bgcolor=ffcccc
| 4
| May 20
| Golden State
| 
| Meyers Leonard (30)
| Meyers Leonard (12)
| Damian Lillard (12)
| Moda Center20,064
| 0–4

Player statistics

Regular season

|-
| align="left"| || align="center"| PF
| style=";"|81 || style=";"|81 || 2,292 || 610 || 104 || 68 || 33 || 760
|-
| align="left"|† || align="center"| PG
| 16 || 0 || 94 || 15 || 12 || 1 || 2 || 30
|-
| align="left"| || align="center"| C
| 77 || 0 || 1,356 || 324 || 71 || 25 || 66 || 512
|-
| align="left"| || align="center"| SG
| 74 || 2 || 1,399 || 120 || 66 || 36 || 12 || 581
|-
| align="left"| || align="center"| SF
| 60 || 53 || 1,415 || 269 || 74 || 67 || 53 || 460
|-
| align="left"|≠ || align="center"| SG
| 27 || 4 || 659 || 45 || 34 || 21 || 7 || 258
|-
| align="left"|≠ || align="center"| C
| 23 || 8 || 512 || 198 || 32 || 14 || 9 || 301
|-
| align="left"|≠ || align="center"| PF
| 9 || 1 || 63 || 19 || 5 || 3 || 3 || 31
|-
| align="left"| || align="center"| SF
| 71 || 33 || 1,327 || 217 || 53 || 31 || 30 || 541
|-
| align="left"| || align="center"| C
| 61 || 2 || 878 || 233 || 75 || 13 || 9 || 357
|-
| align="left"| || align="center"| PG
| 80 || 80 || style=";"|2,838 || 371 || style=";"|551 || style=";"|88 || 34 || style=";"|2,067
|-
| align="left"| || align="center"| SG
| 70 || 70 || 2,375 || 282 || 207 || 55 || 28 || 1,468
|-
| align="left"| || align="center"| C
| 72 || 72 || 1,974 || style=";"|748 || 233 || 71 || style=";"|103 || 1,125
|-
| align="left"| || align="center"| SG
| 20 || 1 || 141 || 13 || 13 || 1 || 0 || 75
|-
| align="left"|† || align="center"| SG
| 44 || 0 || 673 || 80 || 62 || 14 || 4 || 267
|-
| align="left"|† || align="center"| PF
| 18 || 0 || 145 || 52 || 7 || 4 || 0 || 35
|-
| align="left"| || align="center"| SG
| 15 || 1 || 111 || 11 || 5 || 1 || 2 || 40
|-
| align="left"| || align="center"| PG
| 73 || 2 || 1,605 || 328 || 283 || 33 || 18 || 494
|}
After all games.
‡Waived during the season
†Traded during the season
≠Acquired during the season

Playoffs

|-
| align="left"| || align="center"| PF
| style=";"|16 || style=";"|16 || 399 || 100 || 21 || 9 || 10 || 118
|-
| align="left"| || align="center"| C
| style=";"|16 || 0 || 275 || 57 || 14 || 7 || style=";"|22 || 109
|-
| align="left"| || align="center"| SG
| style=";"|16 || 0 || 326 || 25 || 13 || 12 || 4 || 90
|-
| align="left"| || align="center"| SF
| style=";"|16 || style=";"|16 || 388 || 78 || 23 || 18 || 16 || 134
|-
| align="left"| || align="center"| SG
| style=";"|16 || 0 || 373 || 36 || 14 || 6 || 3 || 158
|-
| align="left"| || align="center"| C
| style=";"|16 || 14 || 461 || style=";"|155 || 19 || 11 || 9 || 182
|-
| align="left"| || align="center"| PF
| 3 || 0 || 11 || 0 || 0 || 0 || 0 || 2
|-
| align="left"| || align="center"| SF
| 6 || 0 || 20 || 4 || 0 || 0 || 0 || 5
|-
| align="left"| || align="center"| C
| 11 || 2 || 170 || 40 || 12 || 2 || 1 || 85
|-
| align="left"| || align="center"| PG
| style=";"|16 || style=";"|16 || style=";"|650 || 76 || style=";"|106 || style=";"|27 || 5 || style=";"|430
|-
| align="left"| || align="center"| SG
| style=";"|16 || style=";"|16 || 635 || 80 || 59 || 13 || 10 || 395
|-
| align="left"| || align="center"| SG
| 5 || 0 || 12 || 0 || 0 || 1 || 0 || 4
|-
| align="left"| || align="center"| PG
| style=";"|16 || 0 || 245 || 73 || 35 || 3 || 3 || 43
|}

Transactions

Trades

Free agency

Re-signed

Additions

Subtractions

References

Portland Trail Blazers seasons
Portland Trail Blazers
Portland Trail Blazers
Portland Trail Blazers
Portland
Portland